The 2016–17 Stetson Hatters men's basketball team represented Stetson University during the 2016–17 NCAA Division I men's basketball season. The Hatters, led by fourth-year head coach Corey Williams, played their home games at the Edmunds Center in DeLand, Florida as members of the Atlantic Sun Conference.  They finished the season 11–21, 3–11 in ASUN play to finish in a tie for seventh place. They lost in the quarterfinals of the ASUN tournament to Florida Gulf Coast.

Previous season 
The Hatters finished the 2015–16 season 12–22, 4–10 A-Sun play to finish in a tie for last place. Due to APR violations, Stetson was ineligible for the NCAA tournament, but was eligible for the Atlantic Sun tournament where they defeated NJIT and Lipscomb before losing in the championship game to Florida Gulf Coast. If Stetson had won, North Florida would have received the conference's automatic NCAA Tournament bid as the regular season champion.

Roster

Schedule and results

 
|-
!colspan=9 style=| Regular season

|-
!colspan=9 style=| Atlantic Sun tournament

References

Stetson Hatters men's basketball seasons
Stetson
Stetson Hatters
Stetson Hatters